Piraeus A is a parliamentary constituency in Attica represented in the Hellenic Parliament. It elects six Members of Parliament (MPs) by the reinforced proportional representation system of election.

Election results

Legislative election

Members of Parliament

Members of Parliament (Sep 2015 -Jul 2019)
Theodoros Dritsas SYRIZA
Costas Douzinas  SYRIZA
Georgia Gennia  SYRIZA
Eleni Stamataki  SYRIZA
Konstantinos Katsafados ND
Nikos Kouzilos XA

Members of Parliament (Jan 2015 - Sep 2015)
Theodoros Dritsas SYRIZA
Stathis Leoutsakos SYRIZA
Eleni Stamataki SYRIZA
Konstantinos Katsafados ND
Stavroula Antonakou The River
Nikos Kouzilos XA

Members of Parliament (2012–15)
Konstantinos Arvanitopoulos ND
Konstantinos Katsafados ND
Thodoris Dritsas SYRIZA
Panagiotis Melas ANEL
Nikolaos Kouzilos XA
Repousi Maria DIMAR

Notes and references

Parliamentary constituencies of Greece
1958 establishments in Greece
Constituencies established in 1958
Piraeus